Portuguese-Serbian relations date back to 1882. Portugal has an embassy in Belgrade, and Serbia has an embassy in Lisbon.  Despite support by Portugal for the independence of Kosovo, Serbian Prime Minister Mirko Cvetković was keen to improve bilateral cooperation. Also, Portugal is backing Serbia's accession to the European Union (EU).

History

Portugal established diplomatic relations with the Kingdom of Serbia on October 19, 1917. Relations continued with the successor Kingdom of Yugoslavia. The Portuguese recognized the government in exile of this state after the German occupation of 1941. Relations with the Socialist Federal Republic of Yugoslavia, which took power in 1945 after World War II, were only established in 1974 after the Portuguese Carnation Revolution. Following the dissolution of the SFR of Yugoslavia during the Yugoslav wars, Portugal maintained relations with the Federal Republic of Yugoslavia, later reconstituted as Serbia and Montenegro and finally as the Republic of Serbia after Montenegro declared its independence in July 2006.

In April 1999, Portugal participated in the NATO bombing of Serbia from the Aviano Air Base  in Italy. Portugal also provided troops as part of NATO peacekeeping efforts in the breakaway Serbian province of Kosovo in 1999. In April 1999 Serbia filed a complaint with the International Court of Justice regarding Portugal's use of force in the Federal Republic of Yugoslavia. As of 2007, Portugal still had about 300 troops in Kosovo.

Official meetings and statements

 In December 1997, President of the Federal Republic of Yugoslavia Slobodan Milosevic received Portuguese Foreign Minister Jaime Gama, to discuss strengthening bilateral relations.
 In January 2002 The Foreign Minister of Portugal, Jaime Gama, returned to the Federal Republic of Yugoslavia in his capacity as Organization for Security and Co-operation in Europe (OSCE) Chairman-in-Office. The OSCE was engaged in stabilizing the situation in southern Serbia following the Kosovo War.
In November 2003, Serbia and Montenegro President Svetozar Marović visited Portugal. During this visit he signed an agreement on the  succession of Bilateral Agreements between the SFR of Yugoslavia and Portugal, extending prior agreements on tourism,  business, scientific and technological cooperation, and cooperation in information.
In July 2005 Portuguese Minister of Defense Luís Amado visited Serbia and Montenegro, where he discussed military cooperation with his Serbian counterpart.
 In May, 2007, Portuguese Foreign Minister Luís Amado gave strong support for Serbian ambitions to join the European Union.
 In July 2007, Serbian Prime Minister Vojislav Kostunica visited Lisbon.
 In October 2008, Portugal recognized Kosovo's independence from Serbia. (See also Kosovan–Portuguese relations.)
In November 2008, Portuguese Foreign Minister Luís Amado met with his Serbian counterpart Vuk Jeremić in Belgrade and voiced his support for removing the suspension of a trade agreement between Serbia and the European Union. Also that month, the Serbian Minister of Science and Technological Development met a Portuguese  delegation and discussed cooperation in energy efficiency, nanotechnology and the food industry, with plans to sign a Cooperation Agreement on Science and Technology by the end of 2008.
In February 2009, Serbian Defence Minister Dragan Sutanovac met with his Portuguese counterpart Nuno Severiano Teixeira. They signed an agreement on defense cooperation and discussed Serbia's NATO bid.
In June 2009, Serbian Prime Minister Mirko Cvetkovic met with Portuguese parliamentary speaker Jaime Gama, and discussed improvements to bilateral cooperation.

Economic relations
In the January–October 2006 period bilateral trade between Serbia and Portugal were estimated at US$12.7 million.

See also 
 Foreign relations of Portugal
 Foreign relations of Serbia
 Accession of Serbia to the European Union 
 Kosovo–Portugal relations
 Serbs in Portugal
 Portugueses in Serbia

References

 

 
Serbia
Bilateral relations of Serbia